The 2022 British Speedway Championship was the 62nd edition of the British Speedway Championship. The final was held at the National Speedway Stadium and was won by Dan Bewley.

The original date for the competition had been 1 August but bad weather forced the cancellation of the event after 12 heats. Three riders had been leading at the time with 8 points each, they were Bewley, Tom Brennan and Chris Harris.

Results

The Final 
  National Speedway Stadium, Manchester
 18 September 2022

See also 
 British Speedway Championship

References 

British Speedway Championship
British
Speedway
British Speedway Championship
Sports competitions in Manchester